The Captain David Pugh House is a historic 19th-century Federal-style residence on the Cacapon River in the unincorporated community of Hooks Mills in Hampshire County, West Virginia, United States. It is also known by its current farm name, Riversdell.  It is a -story frame dwelling built in 1835.  It sits on a stone foundation and has a -story addition built in 1910.  The front facade features a centered porch with shed roof supported by two Tuscan order columns.  The rear has a two-story, full-width porch recessed under the gable roof.  Also on the property are a contributing spring house (c. 1835), shed (c. 1900), outhouse (c. 1930), and stone wall (c. 1835).

It was listed on the National Register of Historic Places in 2004.

See also
List of historic sites in Hampshire County, West Virginia
National Register of Historic Places listings in Hampshire County, West Virginia

References

External links
Riversdell farm website

Federal architecture in West Virginia
Houses completed in 1835
Houses in Hampshire County, West Virginia
Houses on the National Register of Historic Places in West Virginia
National Register of Historic Places in Hampshire County, West Virginia
1835 establishments in Virginia